The BM Pedro Alonso Niño Moguer is a handball team Moguer (Andalusia), founded in 1972, currently plays in the National First step after the 09/10 Honor Division B. It is named in honor of the 15-century Spanish explorer Pedro Alonso Niño.

See also 
José Manuel Sierra

External links
  Web BM Pedro Alonso Niño Moguer
  Web Real Federación de Balonmano
  Web R.F. BM: BM Pedro Alonso Niño Moguer

Spanish handball clubs
Sports teams in Andalusia
Handball clubs established in 1972